The Château de Taillebourg is a ruined castle  from the medieval era. It is built on a rocky outcrop, overlooking the village of Taillebourg and the valley of the river Charente, in the Charente-Maritime department of France. It commanded a very strategic position and was therefore the focus of much conflict throughout the medieval era.

It featured in several episodes of the Hundred Years' War and the Saintonge War before that.

The previous castle on the site was shelter for Louis VII of France and Eleanor of Aquitaine on the day after their wedding, in July 1137.

Richard the Lionheart seized this castle in 1179. Geoffrey de Rancon, master of the house, may have died in this action, but he is also listed as having participated in the Third Crusade in the Itinerarium Regis Ricardi and appears as a witness to Richard I's peace treaty with Tancred of Sicily in Messina on 6 Oct 1190. In 1173, Richard had fought against his father in alliance with his brothers and the King of France, Louis. This uprising had failed, and as punishment, Richard was sent to bring the rebellious lords to heel. This conflict lasted five years, ending in the victory of Richard and his destruction of the supposedly impregnable fortress of Taillebourg. This castle was inaccessible on three sides, protected by mountains, and the fourth side was heavily fortified. Richard knew that the overthrow of Taillebourg would lead to the immediate surrender of the barons, and captured the stronghold in his first great military victory.

The castle was later the base for Louis IX of France (Saint Louis), as a guest of Geoffrey IV of Rancon, before the Battle of Taillebourg in 1242.

The Château de Taillebourg ruins have today been converted to a public garden, where one can view the machicolations, the 18th-century battlements and the underground rooms of the old castle. The site's geographical position affords a viewpoint of the valley of the Charente.

See also
 List of castles in France

References

External links

Taillebourg.net (in French)

Buildings and structures in Charente
Ruined castles in Nouvelle-Aquitaine